Psorothamnus emoryi, common names dyebush, white dalea, or Emory's indigo bush, is a perennial legume shrub or subshrub common to the desert mesas of the southern part of the U.S. states of Arizona and California, and regions of the Mexican state of Baja California.

Description
The Psorothamnus emoryi shrub grows to 3-. The leaves are hairy and grayish white, a color helping reflect sunlight.

It has terminal clusters of purple and white pea-like flower. It flowers from March to June, and persists until the hottest and driest weather prevails near early or midsummer.

Uses
The plant is fragrant and oily and has been used for dyes and stains.

References
Calflora Database: Psorothamnus emoryi (Emory Dalea,  Emory indigobush, Emory's indigo bush, dyebush)
Jepson Manual eFlora (TJM2) treatment of Psorothamnus emoryi
USDA Plants Profile for Psorothamnus emoryi (dyebush)
U.C. CalPhotos gallery —Psorothamnus emoryi

emoryi
Flora of Arizona
Flora of Baja California
Flora of the California desert regions
Flora of the Sonoran Deserts
Natural history of the Colorado Desert
Plant dyes
Flora without expected TNC conservation status